The Kanan Tape is a mixtape by American rapper 50 Cent. Released on December 9, 2015 via his community website ThisIs50 and on Datpiff as a free download. The mixtape features guest appearances from American rappers Boosie, Post Malone and Young Buck, featuring production from Sonny Digital, London on da Track and The Alchemist, among others. The artwork was done by Timo Albert.

Background 

On October 13, 2015, 50 Cent announced plans for a project called The Kanan Tape. The mixtape is named after his character Kanan on the Starz drama series Power.

Track listing

Charts

References 

2015 mixtape albums
50 Cent albums
Albums produced by the Alchemist (musician)
Albums produced by Illmind
Albums produced by Scoop DeVille
Albums produced by Sonny Digital
Albums produced by London on da Track